Lo Chun Kit (born 13 November 1985 in Hong Kong) is a former Hong Kong professional football player who currently plays as an amateur player for Hong Kong First Division League club Tai Po. His position is right-back.

Career statistics

Club
As at 20 September 2008

References

External links
 SouthChinaFC.com, 20. 盧俊傑

Accolades

1985 births
Living people
Hong Kong footballers
Association football defenders
Hong Kong First Division League players
Hong Kong Premier League players
Citizen AA players
Eastern Sports Club footballers
South China AA players
Tai Chung FC players
TSW Pegasus FC players